The Mamfe shrew (Crocidura virgata) is a species of mammal in the family Soricidae. It was discovered in 1940, and can be found in Nigeria and Cameroon.

References

Crocidura
Mammals described in 1940